Bharat Heavy Electricals Limited (BHEL) is an Indian central public sector undertaking and the largest government-owned power generation equipment manufacturer. It is under the ownership of Government of India and administrative control of the Ministry of Heavy Industries. Established in 1956, BHEL is based in New Delhi.

History
BHEL was established in 1956 ushering in the heavy electrical equipment industry in India. Heavy Electricals (India) Limited was merged with BHEL in 1974. When it was set up in 1956, BHEL was envisaged as a plain manufacturing PSU, with technological help from the Soviet Union. In 1980's it was cutting edge in thyristor technology.  In 1991, BHEL was converted into a public company. Over time, it developed the capability to produce a variety of electrical, electronic, and mechanical equipment for various sectors, including transmission, transportation, oil and gas, and other allied industries. However, the bulk of the company's revenue is still derived from the sale of power generation equipment such as turbines and boilers. As of 2017, equipment supplied by BHEL constituted around 55% of the total installed power generation capacity in India. The company also supplies electric locomotives to the Indian Railways and defence equipment such as the Super Rapid Gun Mount (SRGM) naval guns manufactured in partnership with the Ordnance Factory Board and simulators to the Indian Armed Forces.

Operations

BHEL is engaged in the design, engineering, manufacturing, construction, testing, commissioning and servicing of a wide range of products, systems and services for the core sectors of the economy, viz. power, transmission, industry, transportation, renewable energy, oil & gas, and defence.

It has a network of 16 manufacturing units, two repair units, four regional offices, eight service centres, eight overseas offices, 15 regional centres, seven joint ventures, and infrastructure allowing it to execute more than 150 projects at sites across India and abroad. The company has established the capability to deliver 20,000 MW p.a. of power equipment to address the growing demand for power generation equipment.

BHEL has retained its market leadership position during 2015–16 with 74% market share in the Power Sector. An improved focus on project execution enabled BHEL record its highest ever commissioning/synchronization of 15059 MW of power plants in domestic and international markets in 2015–16, marking a 59% increase over 2014–15. With the all-time high commissioning of 15000 MW in a single year FY2015-16, BHEL has exceeded 170 GW installed base of power generating equipments.

It also has been exporting its power and industry segment products and services for over 40 years. BHEL's global references are spread across over 76 countries across all the six continents of the world. The cumulative overseas installed capacity of BHEL manufactured power plants exceeds 9,000 MW across 21 countries including Malaysia, Oman, Iraq, UAE, Bhutan, Egypt, and New Zealand. Their physical exports range from turnkey projects to after sales services.

Initiatives
BHEL's investment in R&D is amongst the largest in the corporate sector in India.

During 2012–2013, the company invested about ₹1,252 Crore on R&D efforts, which corresponds to nearly 2.50% of the turnover of the company, focusing on new product and system developments and improvements in existing products. The IPR (Intellectual Property Rights) capital of BHEL grew by 21.5% in the year, taking the total to 2170.

The corporate R&D division at Hyderabad leads BHEL's research efforts in a number of areas of importance to BHEL's product range. Research & product development (RPD) groups for each product group at the manufacturing divisions play a complementary role. BHEL has established Centres of Excellence for Simulators, Computational Fluid Dynamics, Permanent Magnet Machines, Surface Engineering, Machine Dynamics, Centre for Intelligent Machines and Robotics, Compressors & Pumps, Centre for Nano Technology, Ultra High Voltage Laboratory at Corporate R&D; Centre of Excellence for Hydro Machines at Bhopal; Power Electronics and IGBT & Controller Technology at Electronics Division, Bengaluru, and Advanced Fabrication Technology and Coal Research Centre at Tiruchirappalli.

BHEL has established four specialized institutes, viz., Welding Research Institute (WRI) at Tiruchirappalli, Ceramic Technological Institute (CTI) at Bangalore, Centre for Electric Traction (CET) at Bhopal and Pollution Control Research Institute (PCRI) at Haridwar. Amorphous Silicon Solar Cell plant at Gurgaon pursues R&D in Photo Voltaic applications.

BHEL is one of the only four Indian companies and the only Indian public sector enterprise figuring in 'The Global Innovation 1000' of Booz & Co., a list of 1,000 publicly traded companies which are the biggest spenders on R&D in the world.

In 2022, BHEL and Titagarh Wagons formed a consortium and participated in a tender by Government of India. The consortium emerged the second lowest bidder and will be supplying 80 Vande Bharat Trains to Indian Railways.

Criticism
BHEL is selected to construct 1340-megawatt Rampal coal power plant in Rampal Upazila, Bangladesh, which is close to the Sundarbans mangrove forest. The power plant is set up by Bangladesh-India Friendship Power Company Pvt. Limited — a joint venture between NTPC Limited and Bangladesh Power Development Board. The project has faced criticism for the environmental impact and the potential harm to the largest mangrove forest in the world. In 2017 Norway's sovereign wealth fund removed BHEL from its investment portfolio over concerns about the Rampal coal plant.

See also
 Bharathidasan Institute of Management, a college that functions within the BHEL campus; established in partnership with BHEL
 List of public sector undertakings in India

References

External links 
 

Companies based in New Delhi
Manufacturing companies based in Delhi
Gas turbine manufacturers
Locomotive manufacturers of India
Government-owned companies of India
Indian brands
Economy of Bhopal
Electrical engineering companies of India
Industries in Hyderabad, India
Economy of Tiruchirappalli
Indian companies established in 1964
Manufacturing companies established in 1964
1964 establishments in Delhi
Companies listed on the National Stock Exchange of India
Companies listed on the Bombay Stock Exchange